Hymenopappus mexicanus, the Mexican woollywhite, is a North American species of flowering plant in the daisy family. It grows in northern Mexico (Chihuahua, San Luis Potosí) and the southwestern United States (Arizona, New Mexico).

Hymenopappus mexicanus is a biennial herb up to 90 cm (3 feet) tall. One plant produces 1-20 flower heads per stem, each head with 20-40 yellow disc flowers but no ray flowers.

References

External links
Photo of herbarium specimen at Missouri Botanical Garden, collected in New Mexico in 1881

mexicanus
Flora of Arizona
Flora of Chihuahua (state)
Flora of New Mexico
Flora of San Luis Potosí
Plants described in 1883
Taxa named by Asa Gray